The Peter Crimmins Medal is an Australian rules football award given to the player(s) from the Hawthorn Football Club deemed best and fairest for the season. Peter Crimmins was a rover for Hawthorn, playing from 1966 to 1975. He died of cancer just days after the club's 1976 premiership win. The voting system, as of the 2022 AFL season, consists of six coaches and assistants awarding votes after each match; players can receive a maximum of 12 votes per game.

Recipients

Multiple winners

References
General

Specific

Australian Football League awards
Hawthorn Football Club
Australian rules football-related lists